Turbonilla mcguirei is a species of sea snail, a marine gastropod mollusk in the family Pyramidellidae.

References

External links
 To World Register of Marine Species

mcguirei
Gastropods described in 1939